The Spartans Football Club are a Scottish football club based in Edinburgh. They were formed in 1951 by ex-players of Edinburgh University and the original intention was to field a team of graduates of the university. However, the club is now 'open' with players from many backgrounds. Spartans play at Ainslie Park and wear white shirts, red shorts and white socks.

This section of the club joined the new league in 2013, after playing in the East of Scotland Football League, where it had become one of its most successful clubs from the 1970s onwards. Spartans have been allowed to play in the qualifying rounds of the Scottish Cup since 1978 and have qualified for the cup proper on several occasions.

Spartans entered their top amateur side into the SJFA East Region junior setup in 2009, but withdrew in 2013. Spartans also have an Under-20 squad in the Lowlands U20s Development League, who are managed by Les Atkinson.

As well as the Lowland League team, Spartans also have a Saturday amateur side, a Sunday amateur side and several women's teams, including The Spartans W.F.C, who play in the Scottish Women's Premier League.

Spartans chairman Craig Graham was appointed MBE in 2017 for his service to the community of North Edinburgh.

History

Scottish Cup 
The Spartans' most successful Scottish Cup run was in 2003–04, when they defeated Buckie Thistle 6–1 in front of a crowd of 450 in Edinburgh in the first round, before defeating Alloa Athletic 5–3 in a replay (the first game had been drawn 3–3) in Edinburgh in the second round. They then defeated Arbroath (who had been in the SFL First Division only the year before) 4–1 at Gayfield Park in the third round, before being beaten 4–0 at home by Scottish Premier League team Livingston in front of a full house of 3,000 fans at City Park.

Two seasons later in 2005–06, Spartans defeated Berwick Rangers, Lossiemouth and Queen's Park in the first three rounds of the Scottish Cup. They drew 0–0 with First Division side St Mirren in the last sixteen in front of 3,326 fans at City Park, earning a replay at Love Street, where they lost 3–0.

In the 2008–09 Scottish Cup, Spartans' cup run sent them to Pollok, winning through a replay, they then beat Annan Athletic 2–1. In the next round they beat Elgin City 2–1, before being knocked out by Airdrie United in the fourth round.

Spartans, along with four other clubs, submitted an application for entry into the Scottish Football League following Gretna relinquishing their league status on 3 June 2008. Spartans lost out to Annan Athletic.

In November 2008, Spartans moved to a new purpose-built home at Ainslie Park, situated 500 yards from City Park in the Crewe Toll district of Edinburgh. The new facility includes a 504-seater stand and floodlights surrounding the main stadium pitch and an adjacent, full size artificial pitch with floodlights. Ainslie Park is now used daily by youth and adult Spartans teams, along with the general public. The club also won the league title this season.

In the 2009–10 season, Spartans won the quadruple, consisting of the East of Scotland Premier Division, the SFA South Challenge Cup, the King Cup and the League Cup. The 2009–10 league title gave Spartans back to back title wins for the first time since 2005.

During the 2010–11 season, Spartans won their third league title in a row. The next season they lost the league title on goal difference to Stirling University. While, in the 2012–13 season, they finished third in the league.

Lowland League
Spartans joined the newly formed Lowland Football League for the 2013–14 season, winning the inaugural title. They finished as runners-up in 2015–16 and won the League Cup a year later, before becoming Lowland League champions for a second time in 2017–18. This allowed Spartans to take part in the Pyramid play-off, however they lost 5–2 on aggregate to Cove Rangers.

The club progressed to the fifth round (last 16) of the 2014–15 Scottish Cup, defeating Clyde and Morton en route.

In the fifth round of the competition, Spartans forced a replay with Berwick Rangers on 7 February 2015, thanks to an injury time equaliser from Ally MacKinnon to level the tie at 1–1, the game being played in front of 2504 supporters at Ainslie Park.

Stadium

Ainslie Park on Pilton Drive in north Edinburgh is the home ground of Spartans. The stadium has a capacity of 3,000 (504 seated). Ainslie Park is only part of the new project that Spartans have invested into their new ground. It is part of a wider development of the Spartans Community Football Academy. The new facility incorporates a fully enclosed stadium which meets SFA and SPFL criteria, with an artificial pitch, floodlights, seating for 504 spectators and an overall capacity of 3,000. Another full size, floodlit artificial pitch sits adjacent to the main playing area and the accommodation incorporates six changing rooms, a club room, committee room and a physio room. The Club ground holds a P.A system and a bar for spectators.

In March 2017, Edinburgh City reached an agreement with Spartans to use Ainslie Park ground for three seasons while Meadowbank Stadium was being redeveloped.

Senior squad
As of 25 June 2022

On loan

Club officials

Management

Honours

League
Lowland Football League
Winners (2): 2013–14, 2017–18
Runners-up: 2015–16
East of Scotland Football League
Winners (9): 1971–72, 1983–84, 1996–97, 2001–02, 2003–04, 2004–05, 2008–09, 2009–10, 2010–11
Runners-up (7): 1977–78, 1984–85, 1992–93, 1997–98, 1998–99, 2006–07, 2011–12

Cup
SFA South Region Challenge Cup
Winners (3): 2008–09, 2009–10, 2010–11
Lowland League Cup
Winners: 2016–17
East of Scotland Qualifying Cup
Winners (10): 1983–84, 1989–90, 1995–96, 1997–98, 2001–02, 2005–06, 2006–07, 2010–11, 2016–17, 2018-19
East of Scotland City Cup
Winners (3): 2004–05, 2005–06, 2006–07
East of Scotland League Cup
Winners (5): 2003–04, 2004–05, 2009–10, 2010–11
King Cup
Winners (12): 1973–74, 1977–78, 1987–88, 2000–01, 2001–02, 2002–03, 2004–05, 2005–06, 2007–08, 2009–10, 2010–11, 2012–13

Notable players
The former Scotland international Eamonn Bannon had a spell playing for Spartans in the 1990s.

Women's football

Spartans Football Club Women's and Girls is a women's football team that plays in the Scottish Women's Premier League, the top division of women's football in Scotland. Spartans F.C. Women is part of Spartans F.C. in North Edinburgh and play and train at the club's training facilities.

See also
 Foot-Ball Club

References

External links
 

 
Association football clubs established in 1951
Football clubs in Scotland
Scottish Junior Football Association clubs
Football clubs in Edinburgh
1951 establishments in Scotland
East of Scotland Football League teams
Lowland Football League teams
University and college football clubs in Scotland